Moscow Clad in Snow is a 1909 short silent documentary film directed by Joseph-Louis Mundwiller about winter in Moscow 1908.

Synopsis 
The film is in four parts. First, the camera pans the Kremlin and Marshal's Bridge. Sleds are parked in rows. Horse-drawn sleighs run up and down a busy street. Next, we visit the mushroom and fish market where common people work and shop. In Petrovsky Park are the well-to-do. Men are in great coats. A file of six or seven women ski past on a narrow lane. Last, there's a general view of Moscow. A slow pan takes us to a view above the river front where the film began.

Orchestral score on restoration 
The film is inherently silent. Second Life added a soundtrack of Alexander Borodin music for the restored version of the film released by the Russian firm "Krasny Kofe".

External links
 
 

1909 films
American silent short films
American black-and-white films
1900s short documentary films
Black-and-white documentary films
American short documentary films
1900s American films